Darah-ye Rostam is a valley in central Afghanistan, located in Bamyan Province.

See also 
 Bamyan Province
 Valleys of Afghanistan

References 

Valleys of Afghanistan
Landforms of Bamyan Province